The Samsung Galaxy A50 is an Android smartphone manufactured by Samsung Electronics as part of its fifth-generation Galaxy A series lineup. It came with Android 9 Pie, 64 or 128 GB of internal storage, and a 4000 mAh battery. It was launched internationally on February 25, 2019 and in the United States on July 13, 2019.

Specifications

Hardware
The A50 has a 6.4" FHD+ (2340 x 1080) 60 Hz Super AMOLED Infinity-U display, with an 19.5:9 aspect ratio. It is powered by an Octa-core, 2300 MHz, ARM Cortex-A73 and ARM Cortex-A53, 64-bit, 10 nm CPU and a Mali-G72 MP3 GPU. The phone itself measures 158.5 x 74.7 x 7.7mm. It comes with a 4000 mAh battery.

The A50 is sold in 4GB/6GB RAM and 64GB/128GB internal storage configurations, both of which can be expanded via a MicroSD card up to 512GB.

The A50 has an optical (under-screen) fingerprint sensor and facial recognition features used for biometrics.

Camera
The Samsung Galaxy A50 comes with a triple rear camera array consisting of a 25MP wide camera, an 8MP ultra-wide camera, and a 5MP depth sensor camera. It also comes with a 25MP front-facing camera.

A50 Feature and Specs
Camera
Rear Camera
The Main camera of Samsung galaxy A50 is triple as 25 MP, f/1.7, 26mm (wide), PDAF and 8 MP, f/2.2, 13mm (ultrawide), 1/4.0″, 1.12µm & 5 MP, f/2.2, (depth) which is able to take deep and clear photos from many angles. If hardware support them it should record 1080p@30fps.

25 MP, f/1.7, 26mm (wide), PDAF
8 MP, f/2.2, 13mm (ultrawide), 1/4.0″, 1.12µm
5 MP, f/2.2, (depth) 

While the hardware is capable of taking 4K video, it is not accessible by normal means (or by using the included camera app). It can be accessed using third party apps.

Software
The Samsung Galaxy A50 ships with One UI 1.1, based on Android 9.0 (Pie). A stable update to Android 10 and One UI 2.0 was released at the beginning of April 2020. Features include Bixby, Google Assistant and Samsung Pay. An update to One UI 2.5 was released in December 2020.  An update to Android 11 with One UI 3.1 was released in March 2021, the final OS update for the Galaxy A50. It is currently eligible for monthly security updates however it may soon be relegated to quarterly updates Samsung Stated that the phone will not be getting Android 12 One UI 12
and any further OS Updates.

Reception
The A50 received mostly positive reviews. PCWorld gave it 4/5 stars, praising the display, design and battery life while criticizing the in-screen fingerprint sensor and the camera processing. Tom's Guide also gave it 4/5 stars, calling it "a budget phone with a big and colorful screen, solid performance and a sleek design" albeit with an "underwhelming battery life". CNET gave it an 8.4/10, describing it as "one of the best budget phones", and Digital Trends called it "the budget Samsung phone of your dreams".

The A50 was Samsung's best-selling smartphone in 2019, the best-selling smartphone in Europe in 2019, and the third best-selling phone in the world for the third quarter of 2019.

See also
Samsung Galaxy
Samsung Galaxy A series

References

External links
Galaxy A50 skal
 

Galaxy A50 skal

Samsung Galaxy
Mobile phones introduced in 2019
Android (operating system) devices
Samsung smartphones
Mobile phones with multiple rear cameras